Portuguese Handball Fourth Division or "4a Divisão Portuguesa" was the fourth handball league in Portugal in a few seasons
Due to some disputes between the League and the Federation, between 2001 and 2009 the competition was restored under the designation of Portuguese Handball Third Division.
With the ending of the League, and new restructuring of Portuguese Competitions, Fourth Division was again extinct.

Portuguese 4th Division Champions

4
Defunct handball leagues
Defunct sports leagues in Portugal